William Irwin MLA is a Unionist politician from Northern Ireland representing the Democratic Unionist Party (DUP). He was elected in 2007 to the Northern Ireland Assembly as a DUP member for Newry and Armagh.

Irwin was the Mayor of Armagh from 2006–07 and serves on Armagh City and District Council. He is a local dairy farmer.
He entered politics after his son Philip drowned in a swimming pool and he met Ian Paisley. "He was only 15. Dr Paisley came and prayed with us and offered great support.

Irwin stood in the Newry and Armagh constituency at both the 2017 and 2019 General Elections, finishing second on each occasion with 24.6% and 21.7% of the vote respectively.

References

External links
 DUP profile
 Irwin: Armagh Council
 NIA website

1956 births
Living people
People from County Armagh
Democratic Unionist Party MLAs
Democratic Unionist Party parliamentary candidates
Northern Ireland MLAs 2007–2011
Northern Ireland MLAs 2011–2016
Northern Ireland MLAs 2016–2017
Northern Ireland MLAs 2017–2022
Mayors of places in Northern Ireland
Members of Armagh City and District Council
Farmers from Northern Ireland
Northern Ireland MLAs 2022–2027